The men's discus throw was a competition at the 2012 Summer Olympics in London, United Kingdom. The event was held at the Olympic Stadium on 6–7 August. Forty-one athletes from 24 nations competed. The event was won by Robert Harting of Germany, the nation's first victory in the men's discus throw since 1996 and second overall (not counting those won by East and West Germany). Ehsan Haddadi earned Iran's first medal in the event with his silver. Gerd Kanter of Estonia became the 15th man to win multiple medals in the event, adding a bronze to his 2008 gold. Virgilijus Alekna of Lithuania narrowly missed being the second man to win four medals in the event, finishing fourth.

The medals for the competition were presented by Irena Szewińska, Poland; IOC Member, and the medalists' bouquets were presented by Helmut Digel, Germany; IAAF Council Member.

Background

This was the 27th appearance of the event, which is one of 12 athletics events to have been held at every Summer Olympics. The returning finalists from the 2008 Games were gold medalist Gerd Kanter of Estonia, silver medalist Piotr Małachowski of Poland, bronze medalist (and 2000 and 2004 gold medalist and 1996 finalist) Virgilijus Alekna of Lithuania, fourth-place finisher Robert Harting of Germany, fifth-place finisher Frank Casañas of Spain, sixth-place finisher Bogdan Pishchalnikov of Russia, seventh-place finisher Rutger Smith of the Netherlands, ninth-place finisher Mario Pestano of Spain, and twelfth-place finisher (and 2004 bronze medalist and 2000 finalist) Aleksander Tammert of Estonia. Harting, who had won the last two world championships, was the favorite. Kanter, Alekna, and Ehsan Haddadi of Iran were also contenders.

Cyprus, Jamaica, and Montenegro each made their debut in the men's discus throw. The United States made its 26th appearance, most of any nation, having missed only the boycotted 1980 Games.

Qualification

A National Olympic Committee (NOC) could enter up to 3 qualified athletes in the men's discus throw event if all athletes met the A standard, or 1 athlete if they met the B standard. The maximum number of athletes per nation had been set at 3 since the 1930 Olympic Congress. The qualifying distance standards could be obtained in various meets during the qualifying period that had the approval of the IAAF. Both outdoor and indoor meets were eligible. The A standard for the 2012 men's discus throw was 65.00 metres; the B standard was 63.00 metres. The qualifying period for was from 1 May 2011 to 8 July 2012. NOCs could also have an athlete enter the discus throw through a universality place. NOCs could enter one male athlete in an athletics event, regardless of time, if they had no male athletes meeting the qualifying A or B standards in any men's athletic event.

Competition format

Each athlete received three throws in the qualifying round. All who achieved the qualifying distance of 65.00 metres progressed to the final. If fewer than twelve athletes achieved this mark, then the twelve furthest throwing athletes reached the final. Each finalist was allowed three throws in last round, with the top eight athletes after that point being given three further attempts.

Records

, the existing world and Olympic records were as follows.

No new world or Olympic records were set during the competition.

Schedule

All times are British Summer Time (UTC+1)

Summary

Six made the automatic qualifier to the finals, Ehsan Haddadi, Jorge Fernandez and Robert Harting on their first attempt. The top qualifier was defending champion Gerd Kanter, but it took him three throws to get a distance that would qualify. The #10 qualifier was two-time champion Virgilijus Alekna.

In the final, most improved their distances by several meters. Alekna launched a 67.38 on the third throw of the competition. Four throws later, Haddadi took the lead with a 68.18, with Harting moving into second place with 67.79. That was the situation through the first four rounds. Kanter made minor improvements, but was out of the medals until his fifth throw of 68.03, knocking Alekna out of his fourth straight medal. Two throws later, Harting launched the winner, going just 9 cm beyond Haddadi with a 68.27. The 2.01m, 130 kg. Harting celebrated his medal on his victory lap skillfully jumping over the row of women's hurdles already on the track and doing a Hulk Hogan shirt rip.

Results

Qualifying

Qual. rule: qualification standard 65.00m (Q) or at least best 12 qualified (q).

Final

References

Athletics at the 2012 Summer Olympics
Discus throw at the Olympics
Men's events at the 2012 Summer Olympics